McLeans Island is a rural area north and northwest of Christchurch city, and south of Waimakariri River. 

The area was an island in the Waimakariri River until the 1930s, when flood control measures and Great Depression work schemes blocked the south branch of the river which separated the island from the south bank. It was named for the Scottish McLean family, who established Waimakariri Station on the south bank in the 1850s. Allan and John McLean owned the land after their brother Robertson returned to Scotland.

Part of the area is in Waimakariri River Regional Park, which contains McLeans Forest where there are walking, running and cycling tracks. Orana Wildlife Park is a zoo in the area.

Demographics

McLeans Island had a population of 198 at the 2018 New Zealand census, a decrease of 36 people (−15.4%) since the 2013 census, and an increase of 60 people (43.5%) since the 2006 census. There were 63 households. There were 108 males and 93 females, giving a sex ratio of 1.16 males per female. The median age was 46.7 years (compared with 37.4 years nationally), with 27 people (13.6%) aged under 15 years, 39 (19.7%) aged 15 to 29, 93 (47.0%) aged 30 to 64, and 42 (21.2%) aged 65 or older.

Ethnicities were 87.9% European/Pākehā, 4.5% Māori, 7.6% Asian, and 4.5% other ethnicities (totals add to more than 100% since people could identify with multiple ethnicities).

The proportion of people born overseas was 22.7%, compared with 27.1% nationally.

Although some people objected to giving their religion, 42.4% had no religion, 51.5% were Christian and 1.5% had other religions.

Of those at least 15 years old, 36 (21.1%) people had a bachelor or higher degree, and 36 (21.1%) people had no formal qualifications. The median income was $32,600, compared with $31,800 nationally. The employment status of those at least 15 was that 87 (50.9%) people were employed full-time, 30 (17.5%) were part-time, and 3 (1.8%) were unemployed.

References

Suburbs of Christchurch
Populated places in Canterbury, New Zealand